KRI Semarang (594) is an Indonesian Navy hospital ship converted from the fifth  of the Indonesian Navy.

Development 
Indonesia signed a US$150 million contract in December 2004 and the first two Makassar-class were built in Busan, South Korea. The remaining two were built at Indonesia's PT PAL shipyard in Surabaya with assistance from Daesun. The contract for the third and fourth LPD to be built in Indonesia was signed with PT PAL on March 28, 2005.

Construction and career

She was laid down on 28 August 2017 and launched on 3 August 2018 by PT PAL Indonesia. Commissioned on 21 January 2019 as a hospital ship.

COVID-19 response 
The ship transported 68 crews of the cruise ship  who underwent observation for the coronavirus disease 2019 in Sebaru Kecil Island, Thousand Islands, to the Port of Tanjung Priok, North Jakarta, on 15 March 2020. She transported hand sanitizers from Singapore to Batam on 9 April 2020. On 18 May 2020, she was dispatched to carry COVID-19 testing kits and hand sanitizers from Yayasan Temasek Singapura, Singapore, to Indonesia.

References

Auxiliary ships of the Indonesian Navy
Ships built in Indonesia
2018 ships
Hospital ships of Indonesia
Hospital ships involved in the COVID-19 pandemic
Makassar-class landing platform docks